The Bangladesh national cricket team represents Bangladesh in international cricket and is a full member of the International Cricket Council with Test and One Day International (ODI) status.

They first competed in international cricket at 31 March 1986, when they played against Pakistan in a one-day international match at Moratuwa, Sri Lanka; they lost the match by 7 wickets. However, before this match Bangladesh did participate in several unofficial games, including matches in ICC Trophy.

Bangladesh was awarded test status on 26 June 2000 as tenth test playing nation, but had to wait till November of that same year before playing their first test match. At 10 November 2000, Bangladeshi team played their first test match against India, losing the match by 9 wickets. They secured their first Test win against Zimbabwe on 10 January 2005 at MA Aziz Stadium, Chittagong. They won by 226 runs in that first test of the series. Bangladesh needed 35 tests to achieve the feat, only New Zealand needed more (45) to win their first test. Also, Bangladesh took 4 years and 2 months from the date of first test to win a test, best to only New Zealand, South Africa and India. Eventually, Bangladesh completed their first bilateral test series win in that same series when they drew the second and last test at Bangabandhu National Stadium, Dhaka. Before that test and test series win, Bangladesh lost 21 tests (2001–2004) and 16 bilateral series (2001–2004) in a row, which is the present world record. , Bangladesh have played 128 Test matches; they have won 16 matches, lost 95 matches, and 17 matches were drawn.

After the first ODI against Pakistan in 1986, Bangladesh had to wait till 1997 for their first win. In this period Bangladesh regularly participated in one-day international matches which include tournaments like Asia Cup, Austral-Asia Cup. At 16 May 1998, Bangladesh posted its first ODI win when they beat Kenya in the second match of 1998 Coca-Cola Triangular Series at Lal Bahadur Shastri Stadium, Hyderabad. This win ended their streak of losing 22 ODI matches in a row from their first ODI at 1986, which was the world record that time. Though, in the period of  Bangladesh team broken that record to stay winless for 47 matches in row, which consisted of the current world record of 23 straight losses from 1999 to 2002. Besides Bangladesh is the only test playing side that have lost the first ODI they have played against five non-Test sides which includes Canada, Kenya, Ireland, Netherlands and Afghanistan. Even though Ireland and Afghanistan are full members now, during the period of these results, they were listed as associates. Bangladesh won the first bilateral ODI series in 2005, defeating the visiting Zimbabwe side by 3–2 in a 5 match ODI series. In 2019, Bangladesh won the first multi-team international tournament when they defeated West Indies in the final at Malahide Cricket Club Ground, Dublin. It was the first time Bangladesh had won a final match in any format of the game. Till now, this is the only multi-team international tournament Bangladesh have won in any format. , Bangladesh have played 389 ODI matches, winning 137 matches and losing 245 and 7 matches had no result.

Bangladesh played their first Twenty20 International (T20I) against Zimbabwe on 28 November 2006 at Sheikh Abu Naser Stadium, Khulna, winning the match by 43 runs. In 2012, Bangladesh won their first bilateral twenty20 international series consisting of multiple matches when they whitewashed Ireland 3–0 in a 3 match T20I series. , they have played 125 T20I matches and won 44 of them; 79 were lost, with 2 having no result.

Bangladesh have faced ten teams in Test cricket, with their most frequent opponent being Sri Lanka, against whom they have played 20 matches. Bangladesh have registered more wins against Zimbabwe than against any other team, with 7. In ODI matches, Bangladesh have played against 18 teams. They have played against Zimbabwe more frequently in ODI matches with a winning percentage of 62.66 in 47 out of 75 matches. Bangladesh have defeated Zimbabwe on 47 occasions which is their best record in ODIs. They played 17 teams in T20I and have played 13 matches with Zimbabwe. They also have recorded most victories against Zimbabwe defeating them in 9 matches with winning percentage of 69.23.

, Bangladesh is the only test playing nation, which has not been involved in any tied international matches.

Key

Test Cricket

One Day International

Twenty20 International

Notes

References

External links 
 Bangladesh Cricket Stats in ESPNCricinfo
 Bangladesh Cricket Board Official Website

Lists of Bangladeshi cricket records and statistics
Bangladesh in international cricket
Cricket records and statistics